Zabłudowski is a Polish masculine surname, which may be spelled in other countries as Zabludowski, Zabludovski or Zabludovsky; its feminine counterpart is Zabłudowska. The surname  may refer to:
Abraham Zabludovsky (1924–2003), Polish-born Mexican architect
Aron Zabłudowski (1909–1941), Polish chess player
Jacobo Zabludovsky, (1928–2015), Mexican journalist, brother of Abraham

Polish-language surnames